Ernest John Putman Glenister (12 October 1873 – 25 April 1942) was an Australian rules footballer who played with St Kilda in the Victorian Football League (VFL).

References

External links 

1873 births
1942 deaths
Australian rules footballers from Geelong
St Kilda Football Club players